Un jour mon prince is a 2016 fantasy comedy film directed by Flavia Coste. It stars Mylène St-Sauveur, Sarah-Jeanne Labrosse, Jean-Luc Couchard, Hugo Becker, Coste, Pierre-François Martin-Laval and Catherine Jacob.

Premise
In order to prevent their enchanted world to disappear, Queen Titiana sends two Quebec fairies, Blondine and Mélusine, to Paris on a mission to find the ideal man to awaken Sleeping Beauty before her 100th birthday.

Cast

Production
The film was shot in Paris, Nogent-sur-Marne, Charente-Maritime and Angoulême from 20 June to 26 August 2015.

The film premiered at the Festival du Cinéma Européen on 2 April 2016, and was screened at the Cabourg Film Festival on 11 June 2016 and at the Arras Film Festival on 14 November 2016.

References

External links
 

2016 films
2016 comedy films
2010s fantasy comedy films
Canadian fantasy comedy films
Films about fairies and sprites
Films based on Sleeping Beauty
Films set in Paris
Films shot in Paris
France 3 Cinéma films
French fantasy comedy films
Quebec films
French-language Canadian films
2010s Canadian films
2010s French films